The Kostroma is a river in the European part of Russia. It flows through the Kostroma and Yaroslavl Oblasts, and becomes a left tributary of the Volga, which it enters at the Gorky Reservoir, at the city of Kostroma.

Prior to the flooding of the Gorky Reservoir in 1955-1957 the Kostroma River flowed into the Volga within the city limits of Kostroma. The Ipatiev Monastery stands at the old confluence of the Kostroma and the Volga.

Major tributaries include the Vocha, Mezenda, Vyoksa, Tyobza, and Shacha on the left, and the Shugoma, Svetitsa, Selma, Monza, and Obnora on the right. Before the establishment of the Gorky Reservoir, the Sot and Mesa were also tributaries; they now flow directly into the reservoir.

The towns of Soligalich and Buy stand on the river.

The Kostroma freezes up in November and thaws in April or in early May.

The Kostroma begins near the village of Knyazhevo Chuhlomskogo in the Kostroma Oblast. In the upper and middle reaches of the river bed there are rapids, and the banks are often wooded and sometimes steep. Here it is suitable for swimming due to the large amount of snags and debris.

By the time it flows past the town of Buy, the width of the river exceeds ; from this point on the river is navigable. From here down to the reservoir it begins to form large bends  and oxbow lakes, and it sometimes floods.

The last  of the Kostroma's course forms the border between the Yaroslavl and Kostroma oblasts.

Etymology 
The river bears the name of the Slavic goddess Kostroma.

References

Rivers of Kostroma Oblast
Rivers of Yaroslavl Oblast